Paectes longiformis is a moth in the family Euteliidae first described by Michael G. Pogue in 2012. It is found in the north-eastern Brazilian state of Bahia.

The larvae have been reared from Schinus terebinthifolius.

References

Moths described in 2012
Euteliinae